Oswaldo Méndez (born 18 December 1956) is a Guatemalan equestrian. He competed in show jumping at the 1976 Summer Olympics in Montreal when he placed 22nd, and at the 1980 Summer Olympics in Moscow, where he placed fourth in the individual competition. At the time, it was the best ever Olympic result for Guatemala.

References

1956 births
Living people
Guatemalan male equestrians
Olympic equestrians of Guatemala
Equestrians at the 1976 Summer Olympics
Equestrians at the 1980 Summer Olympics
Equestrians at the 1984 Summer Olympics